Mircea Beuran (born June 5, 1953) is a Romanian General Surgeon, academic professor and head of the department of surgery at Carol Davila University of Medicine and Pharmacy of Bucharest, who served as the Health Minister in Adrian Năstase cabinet. Between 2000 and 2003 he was State Councilor. He is the director of the Surgery Clinic within the Emergency Hospital of Bucharest. Spitalul Clinic de Urgență București

Presently, he is the First Vice-President of the Romanian Medicine Academy and surgeon in the Hospitals Group Sanador.

Notes

External links
 BBC NEWS
 Video Interview

Social Democratic Party (Romania) politicians
Members of the Chamber of Deputies (Romania)